This article is a list of things named after the French scientist Louis Pasteur (1822-1895).

Science
 Pasteurization
 Pasteur effect
 Pasteur point
 Pasteur pipette
 Pasteur–Chamberland filter

Institut Pasteur 

 Institut Pasteur
 Institut Pasteur in Ho Chi Minh City (Vietnam)
 Institut Pasteur de Dalat (Vietnam)
 Institut Pasteur Korea
 Pasteur Institute of Lille (France)
 Pasteur Institute of Iran
 Pasteur Institute of Algiers (Algeria)
 UNESCO/Institut Pasteur Medal 
 Musée Pasteur

Others

Astronomical features 
 Pasteur (lunar crater)
 Pasteur (Martian crater)
 4804 Pasteur, asteroid

Educational

Elementary schools 
Louis Pasteur Elementary School in Detroit, Michigan (United States)

Middle school

High schools 

 Lycée Pasteur in Neuilly-sur-Seine (France)
 Lycée Pasteur de São Paulo (Brazil)
 Lycée français Louis-Pasteur de Bogotá (Colombia)
 Lycée Français Louis Pasteur de Lagos (Nigeria)
 Lycée Louis Pasteur in Calgary (Canada)

Universities 
 Louis Pasteur University, Strasbourg (France)
 Louis Pasteur University Hospital in Košice (Slovakia)

Hospitals 
 Centre hospitalier Louis Pasteur, Dole (France).
 Louis Pasteur Private Hospital in Pretoria (South Africa).
 Life Louis Pasteur Private Hospital, Bloemfontein (South Africa).

Stations 

 Pasteur (Milan Metro) (Italy)
 Pasteur (Paris Métro) (France)
 Pasteur - AMIA (Buenos Aires Underground) (Argentina)

Streets

France 

In France, there are about 2,020 streets named after Louis Pasteur

 Avenue Pasteur, Arbois
 Avenue Pasteur, Dole

Vietnam 
 Avenue Pasteur, Ho Chi Minh City (one of the few streets in that city to retain its French name)

United States 
 Avenue Louis Pasteur in Boston's Longwood Medical and Academic Area

Iran
Pasteur Street is an important street in Tehran, Iran in which key government institutions are located. It is highly secured because of the presence of key institutions such as the office of the Iranian President, the center of Iran's Revolutionary Guards Intelligence leadership, the center of the Assembly of Experts, and the Supreme National Security Council. Also Several military schools, the center of the Armed Forces Logistics and Center for Strategic Studies are located in the street

Canada 
 Louis-Pasteur Private on the campus of the University of Ottawa

Indonesia 
 Pasteur street and Pasteur village in Bandung

Other locations 
 Pasteur Island
 Pasteur Peninsula
 Mount Pasteur in New Zealand's Paparoa Range was named after him in 1970 by the Department of Scientific and Industrial Research.

See also 
 Liebig–Pasteur dispute
 Koch–Pasteur rivalry
 Pasteur's portrait by Edelfelt
 The Story of Louis Pasteur
 Sanofi Pasteur
 Pasteur (disambiguation)

Notes and references 

Pasteur
Named after